Richard Edward Fair (17 November 1907  – 20 July 1982) was an Australian actor of stage and screen and radio compere and producer, who also did voice.over. He is best known for hosting the enormously popular radio shows Australia's Amateur Hour and 'Australia's Hour of Song', a community singing hour with guest performers. He occasionally acted under the name Grant Lyndsay.

Biography

Early life and study
Fair was born in Mosman, New South Wales, to Richard Edward Fair Snr, Canadian-born contractor and his second wife Emily Gertrude Kennedy, from Victoria, he attended St. Aloysius College and St.Ignatius College, and studied voice production and attending Andrew McCann's acting school

Stage and film
Fair made his stage debut in a production of The Terror aged 19, and worked for numerous theatre companie's including Maurice Moscovitch Company, and J.C. Williamson Ltd. and toured with Bert Bailey in The Patsy

He appeared in several film roles including the Ken Hall produced On Our Selection and The Squatter's Daughter

Radio compere and entertainer
Fair commenced a successful run in radio, from 1935, with a breakfast program at 2SM, before joining rival station 2GB in 1937 and singing on The Jack Davey Show, consequently released from his contract, he was signed to host both the Lux Radio Theatre and Australia Amateur Hour, both first at 2UE then at 2UW,the program that had started as a Sydney-based program, soon. went nationwide broadcast to capital cities, he would take over as a producer of the latter, when his co-star Harry Dearth was drafted in the Air Force, Dearth returning to the program in 1946 and finding the travel arduous, he resigned in 1950. In 1952, the returned to radio 2UEto host the equally successful Australia's Hour of Song, that was broadcast over 49 nine stations  
the program would feature singers includoing Peter Dawson and Gladys Moncrieff, he worked as an announcer of serials, commercials, and various chat. He went freelance as a producer in 1960, working at 2CH for some ten years, after which he returned to 2GB for a late night music program.

Personal life
Fair married Agnes Margaret McLeod on 23 September 1933, at St. Mary's Basilica with Catholic rites.
 
He was involved in a court case, by his landlady in 1958, who sought that he be evicted from her Vaucluse home, under the grounds of being  frequently drunk and disorderly, twice setting fire to bedding and playing music late at night on full volume. He won the case and remained in the apartment until 1963. For most of his life, Fair had resided in the Eastern Suburbs, moving into a nursing home in Normanhurst, New South Wales 1974, where he died on 20 July 1982.

Filmography

References

External links
 
 
 Dick Fair at Australian Dictionary of Biography
 Clips featuring Dick Fair (as "Grant Lyndsay") from The Squatters Daughter
 Clip from British Pathé of Dick Fair introducing a boy music prodigy, 1948. 

1907 births
1982 deaths
Male actors from Sydney
20th-century Australian male actors
Australian people of Canadian descent